Armide was a 40-gun frigate of the French Navy, lead ship of her class, and launched in 1804 at Rochefort. She served briefly in the French Navy before the Royal Navy captured her in 1806. She went on to serve in the Royal Navy until 1815 when she was broken up.

French service
Armide took part in Allemand's expedition of 1805. On 18 July, she captured and burnt a Prussian cutter to maintain the secrecy of the movements of the fleet, in spite of the neutrality of Prussia at the time. The next day, she captured  and burnt her. She then took part in the assault on the Calcutta convoy, helping  engage and capture .

In March 1806, under Amable Troude, Armide helped repel an attack led by Robert Stopford at Les Sables-d'Olonne.

Capture

Centaur lost three men killed and three wounded. In addition, a musket ball shattered Hood's arm, which had to be amputated. The wound forced Hood to quit the deck and leave the ship in the charge of Lieutenant William Case. Centaur also lost most of her lower rigging. In all, the British lost nine men killed and 32 wounded. Hood estimated that the French had 650 men aboard each vessel, inclusive of soldiers, but put off till later any estimate of their losses.

Armide arrived at Plymouth on 2 October 1806, where she was laid up. In 1807 and 1808 she was in ordinary in Plymouth. She then underwent repairs between February and October 1809.

British service
Armide entered British service as the 38-gun fifth rate HMS Armide. In August 1809 Captain Lucius Ferdinand Hardyman commissioned her and assumed command.

Napoleonic Wars
In January 1810 Armide, under Captain Hardyman, and the 80-gun second rate, Captain Sir Joseph Sydney Yorke, were stationed off the Basque Roads. On 10 January, they sighted a small convoy sailing from the Île d'Aix to La Rochelle. The boats of the two ships went in under small arms and grapeshot fire from a shore battery and captured a chasse-maree of about 30 tons. The tide was ebbing too fast to bring off the other vessels so the British burnt a brig, a schooner and a chasse-maree. This was regrettable as the all were fully laden with cargoes consisting of best quality wines and brandies, soap, rosin, candles, pitch, oil, pine varnish, and the like. The cutting out expedition suffered no casualties. The captured chasse maree was probably the Felicite.

On 19 January Armide recaptured the brig Hope. The next evening, boats from Armide and Christian VII pursued about 30 vessels that were coming out from the Maumusson Pass, between the Île d'Oléron and the mainland, making for La Rochelle. The French convoy then ran aground close under shore batteries. Still, the British were able to take one chasse-maree and burn four, despite heavy fire from the shore batteries. The rest escaped and headed back from where they had come. Two French sailors died in the affair and Armide had one man wounded. The captured chasse maree was probably Glorieuse.

On the night of 12 February, another convoy of ten vessels sailed from the river Charente and three chasse-marées went aground on the reef off the Point de Chatelaillon between La Rochelle and Île d'Aix. Yorke then sent in three boats each from Armide and Christian VII, plus two from HMS Seine, to attack them. Nine French gunboats, each carrying a 12-pounder carronade and six swivel guns, and manned with sufficient men for 20 to 30 oars, fled from the British boats. The British, led by Lt. Gardiner Henry Guion, captured one gunboat, killing two of her crew and wounding three, including her commander; two gunboats grounded and could not be retrieved. The British then burnt the three chasse-marees that they had captured.

On 29 April Armide was in company with  when they captured the Aimable Betsie.  and the hired armed cutter  also shared in the proceeds of the capture of  Aimable Betzie.

Despite strong fire from shore batteries and the convoy's escorts, the British capture and burnt 13 vessels and forced four ashore. Armide lost three men killed and three wounded.

In August Captain Richard Dalling Dun assumed command. On 27 September, the boats of the 120-gun first rate , Captain Sir Harry Neale, the 74-gun  third rate , Captain Robert Dudley Oliver, and Armide, captured two laden brigs and burned a third that had taken shelter under the guns of a battery on the Point du Ché, near Angoulins. A force of 130 Royal Marines from the two ships of the line also took and destroyed the battery after engaging reinforcements on the way. The British suffered two men wounded, but killed at least 14 French soldiers in the battery alone. The next day Armide, Caledonia, Valiant,  and the hired armed cutter  captured the San Nicolas and Aventura.

On 9 January 1811, Armide and  recaptured the Nancy.

Captain Francis Temple assumed command in September 1812. Armide was in sight on 23 December when the hired armed cutter Nimrod recaptured , and so shared in the salvage money.

On 16 January 1813, Armide grounded near two batteries on Point St. Jaques, Quiberon Bay. When the French hailed them, the pilot on Armide replied that she was the frigate  and that they required no assistance. Her crew managed to re-float Armide before the French discovered they had been tricked. Still, a court-martial reprimanded Temple, "dis-rated the master from his ship", and fined the pilot of all his pay, while also sentencing him to imprisonment in the Marshalsea for two months.

War of 1812

From 5 February 1813 to May 1815 Armide was under the command of Captain Edward Thomas Troubridge. On 14 May, he brought her into Nova Scotia, together with a convoy of three store ships from Cork.

On 7 August 1813 Armide captured an American schooner laden with munitions of war on the Rappahannock River at Windmill Point and with two ladies as passengers. Armide forwarded the ladies to their place of destination but kept their two male escorts and three sailors as prisoners.

She had thrown two guns overboard while pursued. The next day Armide captured the French letter of marque Invincible, formerly . She was armed with 16 guns but had thrown ten overboard. She was of 331 tons burthen (bm) and had a crew of 60 men.

Little Belt was an American sloop of 18 tons (bm) and 3 men, sailing from New York to Charleston, that  destroyed on 26 September off "the Capes" after taking off Little Belts cargo.

On her way down two American gunboats fired on Armide, which led to the Battle of Lake Borgne. Boats from the British fleet, under Captain Nicholas Lockyer of Sophie, and including Armide, captured the American gunboat flotilla. In this boat action British casualties were 17 men killed, including one from Armide, and 77 wounded. In 1847 the Admiralty issued a clasp (or bar) marked "14 Dec. Boat Service 1814" to survivors of the boat service who claimed the clasp to the Naval General Service Medal.

After the British had succeeded in silencing American naval opposition, the British transported their troops 60 miles to Bayou Catalan (or des Pecheurs) at the head of Lake Borgne. The troops landed on 23 December and took up a position across the main road to New Orleans. While Captain Troubridge took command of the naval brigade ashore, Armide remained at anchor off Cat Island (Mississippi).

After their defeat in the Battle of New Orleans in January 1815 the British withdrew. Cochrane left the British headquarters on 14 January, returning to Armide on the 16th.

Fate
In February Armide was at Bermuda ready for passage home. She was broken up in November 1815.

Notes

Citations

References
Flournoy, Henry W. (1892) Calendar of Virginia State papers and other manuscripts:... preserved in the Capitol at Richmond. (R.F. Walker).

External links
 
 Phillips, Michael Ships of the Old Navy - Armide (1806) 
 Plan of the Armide

Armide-class frigates
Frigates of the Royal Navy
Age of Sail frigates of France
Ships built in France
1804 ships
Captured ships
War of 1812 ships of the United Kingdom